Yulin Subdistrict is a subdistrict in Xinchang County, Zhejiang, China. , it has one residential community, 42 villages, and one water reservoir community under its administration.

See also 
 List of township-level divisions of Zhejiang

References 

Township-level divisions of Zhejiang
Xinchang County